Thomas "Tommy" Henry Pickup (third ¼ 1901 – death unknown) was an English professional rugby league footballer who played in the 1920s and 1930s.

Background
Tommy Pickup's birth was registered in Wakefield district, West Riding of Yorkshire, England.

Playing career

County honours
Tommy Pickup won cap(s) for Yorkshire while at Wakefield Trinity.

County Cup Final appearances
Tommy Pickup played  in Wakefield Trinity's 9-8 victory over Batley in the 1924–25 Yorkshire County Cup Final during the 1924–25 season at Headingley Rugby Stadium, Leeds on Saturday 22 November 1924, and played left-, i.e. number 4, in the 3-10 defeat by Huddersfield in the 1926–27 Yorkshire County Cup Final during the 1926–27 season at Headingley Rugby Stadium, Leeds on Wednesday 1 December 1926, the original match on Saturday 27 November 1926 was postponed due to fog.

Notable tour matches
Tommy Pickup played right-, i.e. number 3, and scored a try in Wakefield Trinity's 3-29 defeat by Australia in the 1921–22 Kangaroo tour of Great Britain match at Belle Vue, Wakefield on Saturday 22 October 1921.

Club career
Tommy Pickup made his début for Wakefield Trinity during August 1920, he made his début for the Featherstone Rovers on Saturday 19 January 1929, he appears to have scored no drop-goals (or field-goals as they are currently known in Australasia), but prior to the 1974–75 season all goals, whether; conversions, penalties, or drop-goals, scored 2-points, consequently prior to this date drop-goals were often not explicitly documented, therefore '0' drop-goals may indicate drop-goals not recorded, rather than no drop-goals scored. In addition, prior to the 1949–50 season, the archaic field-goal was also still a valid means of scoring points.

Genealogical information
Thomas Pickup's marriage to Olive (née Parkin) was registered during fourth ¼ 1925 in Wakefield district. They had children; John A. Pickup birth registered during first ¼ 1932 in Wakefield district), and Jacqueline M. Pickup birth registered during second ¼ 1941 in Wakefield district).

References

External links
Search for "Pickup" at rugbyleagueproject.org
Pain of defeat serves Dewsbury well to prevent any repeat performance

1901 births
English rugby league players
Featherstone Rovers players
Place of death missing
Rugby league centres
Rugby league five-eighths
Rugby league players from Wakefield
Wakefield Trinity players
Year of death missing
Yorkshire rugby league team players